Pasquale "Pat" Abbruzzi (August 29, 1932 – June 3, 1998) was an American college and professional Canadian football running back and a successful high school football coach. Abbruzzi played collegiately for the University of Rhode Island (Class of 1955), and professionally for the Canadian Football League Montreal Alouettes for four years (1955–1959).

Early life and college career 
Abbruzzi was born and raised in Warren, Rhode Island and is the younger brother of former NFL player, Lou "Duke" Abbruzzi. Abbruzzi attended Warren High School and went on to the University of Rhode Island following graduation.

As a member of the University of Rhode Island Rams football team, from 1951 to 1954, he was an all star running back. He rushed 562 times for a school record 3389 yards (6 yard per carry average) and 25 touchdowns. His greatest and record setting day was October 4, 1952, versus New Hampshire (a 27-7 win). In this game, Abbruzzi rushed for 306 yards, including a 99-yard run from scrimmage, both school records. He also scored 3 TDs. He was named All-Yankee Conference each of these years and named a New England All-Star from 1952 to 1954.

Professional football career 
Abbruzzi was drafted twice by the Baltimore Colts of the NFL in 1954 (30th round, 352 overall) and 1955 (13th round, 147 overall). Abbruzzi chose the Montreal Alouettes of the Canadian Football League for a pro career, mostly because they offered him a $500 bonus which he used for his honeymoon.

In four years with the Alouettes, 1955 to 1958, he played 49 regular season games and 2 Grey Cup matches (against the Edmonton Eskimos.) He rushed 700 times for a total of 3749 yards (5.4 yard average) with 25 rushing TDs and eleven 100 yard rushing games.

Abbruzzi's greatest year was his first in the CFL, 1955, when he was part of a dynamic Als team that contended for the 1955 Grey Cup. Abbruzzi rushed 182 times and led the CFL in rushing with 1,248 yards (6.9 yard average) and in touchdowns with 17 (his longest rush was 69 yards). Abbruzzi was named the second recipient of the CFL's Most Outstanding Player Award, as well as a CFL All-Star, at the conclusion of the 1955 season. Abbruzzi continued as the Larks top rusher in 1956 with 1,062 yards and was named to a second consecutive CFL All-Star team in 1956. His 20 touchdowns that year stood alone as a CFL record until 1990 and was finally surpassed by Allen Pitts in 1994. In 1957, Abbruzzi had 809 yards, but an injury-plagued 1958 season would turn out to be his last, when Abbruzzi finished the year with 630 yards. In July 1959 he was traded to the Calgary Stampeders for Veryl Switzer during training camp but was released before the start of the 1959 regular season.

Career regular season rushing statistics 

https://www.statscrew.com/football/stats/p-abbrupat001

Teaching career and high school coaching career 
After his professional career, Abbruzzi became a successful and much beloved Physical Education teacher and football coach at his alma mater, Warren High School in Warren, Rhode Island. He coached eight division champions over 26 years, and also coached baseball in his spare time. During the 1970s his football team set an interscholastic league record of 31 victories in a row. Known to all as "Doc", he was a legendary figure in Rhode Island high school football.

Abbruzzi was named to the University of Rhode Island Athletic Hall of Fame in 1972 and the Rhode Island Football Coaches Hall of Fame in 1976. He was a charter member of the Warren Athletic Hall of Fame (1998) and in 2005 Pat was named to the Rhode Island Interscholastic League Hall of Fame. He was later elected to the Sons of Italy Athletic Hall of Fame.

Death 
Pat Abbruzzi died on June 3, 1998.

References

1932 births
1998 deaths
People from Warren, Rhode Island
Players of American football from Rhode Island
American football running backs
Rhode Island Rams football players
Players of Canadian football from Rhode Island
Canadian football running backs
Montreal Alouettes players
Canadian Football League Most Outstanding Player Award winners
Coaches of American football from Rhode Island
High school football coaches in Rhode Island